The 1886 international cricket season was from April 1886 to September 1886. The season consisted of a single international tour, visiting with Australia  England for The Ashes series.

Season overview

July

Australia in England

References

International cricket competitions by season
1886 in cricket